Kofi Middleton Mends (1939–2016) is a Ghanaian veteran actor who contributed to the growth of the movie industry.

Career
He was an actor known for the role he played in No Tears For Ananse and commercial he played for Key Soap. He was lecturer at the University of Ghana and National Film and Television Institute.

Filmography
Grey Dawn (2015)
This Bit of That India (1972)
No Tears for Ananse (1976)
The Other Side of the Rich (1992)
No Time To Die (2006)

Cause of death
He died of kidney failure at the Korle Bu Teaching Hospital in August.

References

1939 births
2016 deaths
Ghanaian actors
Lecturers